The Elk River is in southwestern Oregon in the United States.

Rising in the mountains in northern Curry County, in the Siskiyou National Forest at confluence of its north and south forks, the river initially flows generally west along the south edge of the Grassy Knob Wilderness. It then flows northwest, approaching the coast north of Port Orford and entering the Pacific between Cape Blanco to the north and The Heads to the south.

Course
All but the lowermost  of it are in the Rogue River – Siskiyou National Forest. Forest Road 5325 follows the river along its left bank, becoming County Road 208 (Elk Creek Road) after leaving the national forest.

In its first stretch, Elk River receives McCurdy and Blackberry creeks from the left, then Bungalow Creek from the right before Milbury Creek enters from the left at river mile (RM) 26 or river kilometer (RK) 42. About  further downstream, Butler Creek enters from the right at Butler Bar Campground, and the river becomes the southern border of Grassy Knob Wilderness. Over the next few miles, Lost and Panther creeks enter from the left, then Sunshine Creek from the right near Sunshine Bar Campground,  from the river mouth. Below this, Red Cedar and Slate creeks enter from the right and Platinum Creek from the left.

After turning more sharply northwest, the river receives Bald Mountain Creek from the left, leaves the wilderness, and reaches the Elk River State Fish Hatchery. At this point, Anvil Creek enters from the right. Below the hatchery, Chapman Creek enters from the left, the river turns sharply north and meanders along the national forest border, crossing it a total of five times and leaving it on the final crossing. At this point, Rock Creek enters from the right  from the mouth. About  further downstream, Bagley Creek enters from the left, and below that Indian Creek enters from the right. After Elk River flows under Route 101, it meanders across the coastal flatland and turns north behind sand dunes. It enters the Pacific Ocean between Cape Blanco on the north and Port Orford on the south. In the ocean opposite the mouth are Orford Reef and a portion of the Oregon Islands National Wildlife Refuge.

Recreation
 Fishing, camping, hiking, swimming, and wildlife viewing are among the forms of recreation pursued in the Elk River watershed. The river and its tributaries support native chinook salmon, coastal cutthroat trout, winter steelhead, and coho salmon.

In 1988, parts of the Elk River and its north fork were designated Wild and Scenic. The lower  of the river's north fork are classified "wild." The  segment of the main stem from the confluence of the river's north and south forks to Anvil Creek is classified "recreational."

Three national forest campgrounds—Sunshine Bar and Butler Bar near the main stem and Laird Lake near the south fork— are along Forest Road 5325. The river has many pools that are big enough for swimming.

Whitewater enthusiasts sometimes run all or part of a  stretch of the river between Butler Creek and the Elk River Hatchery. Rapids vary from class 3 to 4 on the International Scale of River Difficulty.

In 2009,  along the north and south forks of Elk River and the upper middle fork of Sixes River were designated as the Copper Salmon Wilderness. The area contains one of the nation's largest remaining stands of low-elevation old-growth forest and one of the healthiest salmon, steelhead, and cutthroat trout runs in the continental United States. Protected species in the region include Port Orford cedar, marbled murrelets and northern spotted owls.

See also

 List of National Wild and Scenic Rivers
 List of Oregon rivers

References

External links
 South Coast Watershed Council

Rivers of Curry County, Oregon
Rivers of Oregon
Wild and Scenic Rivers of the United States